Father and Son is a 1929 German silent film directed by Géza von Bolváry and starring Harry Liedtke, Rolf von Goth, and Charles Puffy. The film's art direction was by Robert Neppach and Erwin Scharf.

Cast

References

Bibliography

External links

1929 films
Films of the Weimar Republic
German silent feature films
Films directed by Géza von Bolváry
Films with screenplays by Franz Schulz
German black-and-white films